John Blackburne (5 August 1754 – 11 April 1833) was an English landowner, Member of Parliament and High Sheriff of Lancashire.

He was born the eldest son of Thomas Blackburne of Hale Hall, Liverpool and educated at Harrow School and Queen's College, Oxford. He succeeded his father to Hale Hall in 1768 and his grandfather John Blackburne to Orford Hall, Warrington in 1786.

He was appointed High Sheriff of Lancashire for 1781–82 and elected MP for Lancashire in 1784, holding the seat until 1830. In Parliament he was an Independent but generally supported William Pitt. He was elected a Fellow of the Royal Society in 1794.

He died in 1833. He had married Anne, the daughter of Samuel Rodbard of Evercreech, Somerset, with whom he had three sons and four daughters.

References

 

1754 births
1833 deaths
Members of the Parliament of Great Britain for constituencies in Lancashire
People educated at Harrow School
Alumni of The Queen's College, Oxford
18th-century English landowners
High Sheriffs of Lancashire
British MPs 1784–1790
British MPs 1790–1796
British MPs 1796–1800
Members of the Parliament of Great Britain for Lancashire
Members of the Parliament of the United Kingdom for Lancashire
UK MPs 1801–1802
UK MPs 1802–1806
UK MPs 1806–1807
UK MPs 1807–1812
UK MPs 1812–1818
UK MPs 1818–1820
UK MPs 1820–1826
UK MPs 1826–1830
Fellows of the Royal Society
19th-century English landowners